"High" is a song by American electronic music duo The Chainsmokers, released on January 28, 2022, via Disruptor Records and Columbia Records as the lead single from the duo's fourth studio album So Far So Good (2022). The music video was released on the same day. It also marks the duo's first new music since World War Joy (2019). A demo version of the song featuring the Kid Laroi was leaked in 2021 before the official version's release. This song made an instant impact on pop radio.

Promotion
In early January 2022, the duo posted a teaser clip, which has waves with a purple filter on Instagram with the caption: "Who's ready? #TCS4". On January 13, 2022, they uploaded a video with the caption: "Sorry, The Chainsmokers Are Back", announcing the single would come out.

Music video
An accompanying music video was released on January 28, 2022, and directed by Kid. Studio. It stars Drew Taggart "chasing a love interest [...] on an airplane, the top of a skyscraper, and falling through the air". The video gathered one million views in less than 24 hours.

Credits and personnel
Credits adapted from Tidal.

 Nick Long – producer, composer, lyricist
 The Chainsmokers – producer, composer, lyricist, associated performer
 Ethan Snoreck – producer, composer, lyricist, associated performer, vocal producer
 Jacob Kasher Hindlin – composer, lyricist
 Jeff Halavacs – composer, lyricist
 Natalie Salomon – composer, lyricist
 Adam Alpert – executive producer
 Jeremie Inhaber – assistant mixer, studio personnel
 Michelle Mancini – mastering engineer
 Jordan Stilwell – mixing engineer, recording engineer

Charts

Certifications

Release history

References

2022 songs
2022 singles
The Chainsmokers songs
Disruptor Records singles
Columbia Records singles
Songs written by Andrew Taggart
Songs written by Alex Pall